Zhang Fan (born 22 August 1984) is a Chinese basketball player who competed in the 2004 Summer Olympics and the 2012 Summer Olympics.

References

1984 births
Living people
Chinese women's basketball players
Basketball players at the 2004 Summer Olympics
Basketball players at the 2012 Summer Olympics
Olympic basketball players of China
Basketball players from Beijing
Asian Games medalists in basketball
Basketball players at the 2010 Asian Games
Basketball players at the 2014 Asian Games
Asian Games gold medalists for China
Asian Games silver medalists for China
Medalists at the 2010 Asian Games
Medalists at the 2014 Asian Games
Beijing Great Wall players
Small forwards